The World Basketball Association (WBA) was a semi-professional men's spring basketball league in the United States. The league suspended operations after the 2013 season.

History
The WBA was conceived in 2009, with seven teams scheduled to play. One of those original seven, the Chattanooga Majic, did not start the season and was replaced by the Bristol Crusaders.

Final teams

Former teams

Champions

References

External links
Official WBA website

 
Basketball leagues in the United States